Escutcheon may refer to:

 Escutcheon (heraldry), a shield or shield-shaped emblem, displaying a coat of arms
 Escutcheon (furniture), a metal plate that surrounds a keyhole or lock cylinder on a door
 (in medicine) the distribution of pubic hair
 (in archaeology) decorated discs supporting the handles on hanging bowls
 (in malacology) a depressed area, present in some bivalves behind the beaks in the dorsal line (about and behind the ligament, if external), in one or both valves, generally set off from the rest of the shell by a change in sculpture or colour.